Anupama Bhagwat is an Indian sitar maestro.

Early life 

Born in Bhilai, India, Bhagwat was introduced to playing sitar at age 9 by Shri. R. N. Verma.  At 13, she started training under Bimalendu Mukherjee, doyen of the Imdadkhani gharana. She stood first in the All India Radio competition in 1994 and was awarded a national scholarship by the Indian Ministry of Human Resource Development of India. 

Bhagwat is currently based in Bangalore, and she has performed several venues in America and Europe.

Her Guru 

Doyen of the Imdadkhani Gharana, Acharya Bimalendu Mukherjee was primarily a Sitarist, though he was proficient in almost all traditional Indian instruments like RudraVeena, Saraswati Veena, Surbahar, Sursingar, Mandrabahar, Dilruba, Esraj, Tar Shehnai, Sarod and Pakhavaj. He was equally adept in vocal music.

Performances 

Performances have taken her around the world Including, SouthBank Center (London, UK), Ali Akbar Khan School of Music (Basel, Switzerland), MIT Fall Concert Series (Boston, USA), U Penn, Berkeley, Ole Miss (USA), Asian Arts Museum (San Francisco), U of Victoria & Calgary, Musée Guimet, Paris, Musée Des Beaux Arts, Angers, France.

Anupama plays in the Gayaki style, a lyrical and subtly nuanced style modelled upon the human voice. Anupama's technical virtuosity has been lauded by the connoisseurs worldwide. Anupama has been awarded the title "Surmani".

Her creative compositions have won the hearts of many a connoisseur, combining technical mastery with evocative lyrical cadences.

Awards and recognitions 
 1-Stood 1st In all India Radio Music Competition (1994)
 2-Scholarship from Ministry of Human Resource Development (Government of India) From 1993-1996
 3-Conferred the title 'Surmani' by Sur Shringar Sansad in 1995
 4-Has been part of world performances such as Global Rhythm and Shanti.
 5-received grants in 2000, 2002, 2004, and 2008, from the Ohio Arts Council (USA).
 The asteroid 185325 Anupabhagwat, discovered by Italian amateur astronomer Vincenzo Silvano Casulli in 2006, was named in her honor.

Albums 

Anupama has released various albums such as Confluence, Ether, Epiphany, Colours of Sunset, Sanjh. And many more.

References

External links 
 

1974 births
Women musicians from Chhattisgarh
Hindustani instrumentalists
Indian classical music
Indian women classical musicians
Living people
People from Bhilai
Sitar players
Musicians from Chhattisgarh
20th-century Indian women musicians
20th-century Indian musicians
21st-century Indian musicians
21st-century Indian women musicians